The British Rail Class 83 electric locomotives were built by English Electric at Vulcan Foundry, Newton-le-Willows as part of the West Coast Main Line electrification.

History

Construction
Fifteen locomotives of British Rail Class 83 were built between 1960 and 1962 by English Electric at Vulcan Foundry, as part of British Rail's policy to develop a standard electric locomotive. Five prototype classes (81-85) were built and evaluated, which eventually led to the development of the Class 86 locomotive.

Three of these locomotives were to have been built as Type B, geared for freight trains, but as it was only two were so built, becoming E3303 and E3304. The third Type B, E3305, was never built as such. Instead it was used as a test bed with silicon rectifiers and transductors, this being the first step towards thyristor control. It became a Type A, geared for passenger trains, and numbered E3100.

The other two Type B locomotives were eventually rebuilt as Type A, being renumbered E3098 (ex E3303) and E3099 (ex E3304). Power was provided by overhead catenary energized at 25,000 V AC.

Under the pre-TOPS British Rail classification, the first fourteen locomotives, E3025 - E3035 and E3303, E3304 (later E3098 and E3099) were Class AL3 (meaning the 3rd design of AC Locomotive). The fifteenth engine, E3100 became Class AL3/1. All fifteen were included in the TOPS numbering system, being renumbered 83001-015.

The Polish EU06 class was produced by English Electric at the same time as the Class 83s and externally they are quite similar.

In service
By 1965, electrification had spread south to London Euston.

Storage and refurbishment
As with the Class 84, the Class 83 suffered with problems due to the mercury-arc rectifiers. After spending several years in storage (1967 to 1971), they were rebuilt with silicon rectifiers, as were already fitted to E3100, and dual braking between July 1970 and October 1973.

The decision to reinstate the fifteen engines of Class 83 was the result of the extension of the electrification from Weaver Junction to Glasgow, which required more electric locomotives. With both Class 83 and Class 84 being returned to traffic only thirty-six Class 87 were required to be built.

Later use
Electrification finally reached Glasgow in the early 1970s, allowing this class to operate the full length of the West Coast Main Line.

The last three in service (83009, 83012 and 83015) were retained for use on empty coaching stock workings from London Euston Station to Willesden. 83009 had previously been used at Longsight in Manchester, to convert the 25 kV AC supply to 1500 V DC, to allow testing of the Class 506 units following the closure of Reddish Depot.

Withdrawal

Two engines were withdrawn early as a result of accidents. The first was 83003, withdrawn in May 1975, which was severely damaged in an accident on 23 January 1975 at Watford with a Class 86 (86209).

The second engine was 83004 which, on 24 December 1977, was severely damaged in a collision with a Class 47 at Willesden. In 1983, ten of the remaining thirteen engines were withdrawn, all being sent to the Vic Berry Scrapyard in Leicester. The final three were withdrawn in 1989, with two of the three being scrapped at MC Metals of Glasgow in 1993.

Power supply 
The locomotives always worked on power provided by overhead catenary energised at 25,000 V AC. However, the main transformer, normally operated with the four windings in series, could be operated at 6250 V AC with the transformer windings in parallel. This voltage was initially to be used where limited clearances gave concern over use of the higher voltage. Since the clearances were found to be adequate, the lower voltage connections were locked out of use.

Preservation 

One locomotive has been preserved by the AC Locomotive Group.
83012 / E3035 - Barrow Hill Engine Shed

The locomotive was originally preserved by Pete Waterman in 1992, and then purchased by the AC Locomotive Group in 1997.

Fleet details

References

Sources

Further reading

External links 

 AC Locomotive Group - Owners of preserved locomotive no. 83012 / E3035

83
English Electric locomotives
Vulcan Foundry locomotives
Bo-Bo locomotives
25 kV AC locomotives
Railway locomotives introduced in 1960
Standard gauge locomotives of Great Britain